Ea$y Money is a board game published in 1988 by Milton Bradley.

Contents
Ea$y Money is a game in which the winner is the richest player when all the money in the bank is gone.

Reception
Alan Kennedy reviewed Easy Money for Games International magazine, and gave it 1 star out of 5 (a turkey), and stated that "The verdict on Easy Money? If you like a game with a bit of challenge, forget it. Money was never this easy."

References

Board games introduced in 1988